Takob Akob waterfall is one of the few newly discovered waterfalls in Maliau Basin Conservation Area, in Sabah, Malaysia. Takob Akob Falls was named after the mangosteen look-alike tree found beside the falls. 

It is about 3.5 kilometers away from Nepenthes Camp (Camel Trophy Camp), about an hour trekking.

References

Waterfalls of Malaysia
Landforms of Sabah